Elwood C. "Woody" Thorpe (February 5, 1929 - March 29, 2021), was an American politician who was a member of the North Dakota State House of Representatives. He was a Democrat. He was an alumnus of the University of North Dakota. He was a retired automotive dealer and alumnus of Wahpeton School of Science and Junior College.

References

1929 births
2021 deaths
People from Minot, North Dakota
University of North Dakota alumni
Democratic Party members of the North Dakota House of Representatives